Raymond Claude Canaway (26 October 1911 – 19 January 1989) was an Australian rules footballer. He played one game for Fitzroy in the Victorian Football League (VFL) in 1933. This match was the Round 15 clash against Melbourne at the Melbourne Cricket Ground.

References

Holmesby, Russell and Main, Jim (2011). The Encyclopedia of AFL Footballers. 9th ed. Melbourne: Bas Publishing.

1911 births
Fitzroy Football Club players
1989 deaths
Australian rules footballers from Victoria (Australia)